TIAA Bank Center is a skyscraper in Jacksonville, Florida, USA. Formerly known as the Southern Bell Telephone Building, the AT&T Tower, and EverBank Center, it took its former name in 2012 when EverBank moved employees into the building and acquired signage rights. The building is currently called TIAA Bank Center, although no formal announcement has been made, and signage changes have not been completed, as of EverBank's rebranding, effective on June 4, 2018.

History

The building was designed by KBJ Architects and opened in 1983. It takes up an entire city block in Jacksonville's downtown. The building was built by The Auchter Company. A notable feature of the structure is that each floor has 16 corner offices. The building was constructed on the former site of the Hotel Mayflower.

The tower was built for the Southern Bell Telephone company. The following year, American Telephone & Telegraph (AT&T) was forced to divest its regional phone companies and Southern Bell became a unit of BellSouth; the signage was changed to reflect the new name. In 2006 AT&T re-acquired BellSouth and the signage was changed back to AT&T in 2008.

In 2011 CSX vacated space it had rented in the tower, leaving it mostly empty. Later that year the City of Jacksonville finalized a deal with EverBank, in which the bank received tax incentives to relocate over 1,200 employees into the building and add 200 jobs. EverBank took over nine floors and acquired the naming rights to the tower, which was renamed EverBank Center. Employees moved into the building in summer 2012, with signage installed in September and October.

Details
The entrance to the building features a two-story atrium. There is a 280-seat auditorium on the second level and a backup power system for the entire building. The JTA Skyway central station is across the street and an adjoining seven-level parking garage has spaces for 641 vehicles. The building was purchased in 2004 by El Ad Florida for $91 million. In 2014 the building was acquired by Amkin Real Estate, a privately owned real estate investment company based in Miami, FL.

Gallery

See also
Architecture of Jacksonville
 Downtown Jacksonville
 List of tallest buildings in Jacksonville
List of tallest buildings in Florida

References

External links

TIAA
EverBank
AT&T buildings
KBJ Architects buildings
Skyscraper office buildings in Jacksonville, Florida
Modernist architecture in Florida
Downtown Jacksonville
Northbank, Jacksonville
Jacksonville Modern architecture
Office buildings completed in 1983
1983 establishments in Florida